Electronic Attack Squadron 142 (VAQ-142), also known as "The Gray Wolves", is an EA-18G Growler squadron of the United States Navy stationed at Naval Air Station Whidbey Island, Oak Harbor, Washington. Their tailcode is AJ and their ATC callsign is "GRIM".

Mission

First VAQ-142
Electronic Attack Squadron 142 (VAQ-142) was established 1 June 1988, in response to the Navy's requirement for a thirteenth operational EA-6B Prowler squadron. As a result of defense spending reductions, VAQ-142 was disestablished in March 1991 and remaining personnel were transferred to a pre-establishment detachment for VAQ-35. On 1 June 1991 VAQ-35 was established with the Electronic Warfare Support mission, under the cognizance of Fleet Electronic Warfare Support Group (FEWSG). In their brief history, VAQ-35 made over forty-two detachments to more than sixteen locations. In October 1993, due to further spending cuts, VAQ-35 was disestablished, and their mission was absorbed by reserve squadrons based in the East and West Coasts.

Second VAQ-142

In 1994, the Department of Defense sought to replace the Air Force's aging EF-111A Raven fleet and provide a joint service solution with the addition of five new expeditionary EA-6B squadrons. On 3 April 1997, the second and current squadron designated VAQ-142 was established as the fourth of these new squadrons, and officially designated the "Gray Wolves". Over the next four years, VAQ-142 forward deployed operationally around the world, participating in numerous multi-national exercises. The squadron saw their first combat deployment in 1998, when they deployed three times to Prince Sultan Air Base, Saudi Arabia in support of Operations Southern Watch and Desert Fox, and received both the 1998 Battle "E" and Safety "S" awards as well as the 1999 Association of Old Crows Outstanding Unit Award.  From 1999 to 2002, the squadron deployed to Prince Sultan two more times in support of Operation Southern Watch and three times to Incirlik Air Base, Turkey in support of Operation Northern Watch, winning the Safety “S” again in both 2001 and 2002.

Afghanistan and Iraq
In December 2003, within a week of receiving short-notice deployment orders, the squadron departed en route to Bagram Air Base, Afghanistan in support of Operation Enduring Freedom. They were sent to relieve the small VAQ-137 detachment  and this made them the first full Navy squadron to deploy completely to Afghanistan. Following an October 2004 deployment to MCAS Iwakuni, Japan, VAQ-142 returned to Bagram in July 2006 through January 2007, flying missions for 187 days in support of Operation Enduring Freedom. The squadron were awarded the 2006 Battle “E” and Safety “S” awards.

In October 2007, VAQ-142 deployed to Al Asad Airbase, Iraq, for six months as a forward deployed expeditionary squadron in support of Operation Iraqi Freedom. Following this deployment, the squadron received the 2007 Safety “S” and were awarded the 2008 Association of Old Crows Outstanding Unit Award. In 2008 the squadron returned to Al Asad in January 2009, again in support of the Iraq War. In May 2010, VAQ-142 returned a final time to Al Asad, flying missions in support of Operations Iraqi Freedom and New Dawn, and marking the final EA-6B expeditionary deployment to Iraq.

Return to the Air Wing
VAQ-142 returned to carrier aviation in May 2011 when they joined Carrier Air Wing Eleven (CVW 11) attached to USS Nimitz. After transition to the Improved Capability (ICAP) III EA-6B airframe, VAQ-142 and CVW-11 began work-ups with Carrier Qualification on board USS Nimitz in April 2012. In August 2012, the squadron completed the first squadron carrier detachment in over 21 years as part of the 2012 Rim of the Pacific Exercise (RIMPAC). In April 2013, VAQ-142 deployed with the USS Nimitz and CVW-11 as part of Carrier Strike Group Eleven (CSG 11) for a planned six-month deployment to the Fifth Fleet AOR. Once on station, the squadron flew 93 combat sorties totaling 637 flight hours with a 100% combat sortie completion rate in support of Operation Enduring Freedom. The Nimitz Strike Group was unexpectedly redirected to the Red Sea in response to the Syrian chemical weapons crisis. After several extensions in the Red Sea, the squadron ultimately completed a nine-month deployment that included operations in the U.S. Third, Fifth, Sixth, and Seventh Fleet AORs. Following this deployment, VAQ-142 received the 2013 Battle “E” and Safety “S” awards, and was awarded the 2013 Arleigh Burke Fleet Trophy.

In July 2014 VAQ-142 delivered four EA-6B Improved Capability (ICAP) III Prowlers to the 309th Aerospace Maintenance and Regeneration Group (AMARG) for induction into long-term preservation. The squadron are currently at their homeport of NAS Whidbey Island, Washington, and recently completed their transition to the EA-18G Growler.

See also
 History of the United States Navy
 List of United States Navy aircraft squadrons

References

External links 

 Official Website

Electronic attack squadrons of the United States Navy
Military units and formations in Washington (state)